Drensko Rebro is a settlement in the Municipality of Kozje in eastern Slovenia. It lies in the hills northeast of Lesično. The area is part of the historical Styria region. The municipality is now included in the Savinja Statistical Region.

Mass graves
Drensko Rebro is the site of two known mass graves from the end of the Second World War. They both contain the remains of Croatians that were disarmed and murdered in May 1945 along the road to Virštanj and at the crossroads between Drensko Rebro and Lesično. The Sušica Creek Mass Grave is located in a meadow between Sušica Creek and the road to Pilštanj, between electric poles numbered 41 and 42.

References

External links
Drensko Rebro on Geopedia

Populated places in the Municipality of Kozje